NHM may refer to:
 National Health Mission, a healthcare initiative in India
 Natural history museum, a scientific institution with natural history collections
 Natural History Museum, London
 Natural History Museum of Los Angeles County
 Nederlandsche Handel-Maatschappij, the Netherlands Trading Society
 NHM, a settlement thought by some to be Nahom